Juan Pablo Barinaga (born 13 June 2000) is an Argentine professional footballer who plays as a midfielder for Patronato.

Career
Barinaga joined Patronato from Colón in 2016. After four years progressing through their youth ranks, Barinaga made the breakthrough into Gustavo Álvarez's first-team squad in 2020. He initially featured during pre-season, notably scoring in a friendly match with Atlético Paraná on 11 January. Barinaga made his senior debut on 14 December 2020 during a 4–0 defeat in the Copa de la Liga Profesional away to Rosario Central, as the midfielder replaced Fernando Luna with thirteen minutes left.

Career statistics
.

Notes

References

External links

2000 births
Living people
People from Paraná, Entre Ríos
Argentine footballers
Association football midfielders
Argentine Primera División players
Club Atlético Patronato footballers
Sportspeople from Entre Ríos Province